Mikael Karlsson (Johan Mikael Karlsson; born August 12, 1975 in Halmstad, Sweden) is a Swedish composer based in New York City. He grew up in Gävle, Sweden and moved to NYC in 2001 to study and he took a master's degree in classical composition at the Aaron Copland School of Music 2005.

Before the move, he had come to know Stefan Strandberg, who became the audio designer of the video game developer Digital Illusions CE which led to a request to make the music to Battlefield Bad Company released in 2008. He also wrote the music for   Battlefield Bad Company 2.

Mikael Karlsson has collaborated with the choreographer Alexander Ekman on several occasions. He has, among other things, written music for Ekman's ballets and sets of Tyll and Midsummer Night's Dream at the Royal Opera in Stockholm, Sweden and Swan Lake on the Oslo Opera in Oslo, Norway. They became good friends when Ekman's sister moved into the apartment that Karlsson inhabited in NYC.

Mikael Karlsson has, in addition to classic sets, also made music for film and TV and collaborated with pop artists such as Andreas Kleerup, Lykke Li and Alicia Keys.

In 2014, he was praised by the American Academy of Arts and Letters when he received the Wladimir and Rhoda Lakond Award as "outstanding composer in the middle of his career".

Discography 
Dog (with Rob Stephensson), 2006
Battlefield Bad Company (Official Soundtrack), 2008
Privacy 2008
Life Class (for François Rousseau's Atelier), 2009
Instead EP, 2009
Battlefield Bad Company 2 (Official Soundtrack), 2010
Seven Eight EP, 2010
On This Planet (for Cedar Lake Contemporary Ballet by Benoit-Swan Pouffer), 2010
Day Comes Apart (song cycle), 2010
Nattvittje (string quartet), 2011
Ends (the score for the Cedar Lake Contemporary Ballet performance on So You Think You Can Dance), single, 2012
Tyll (an Alexander Ekman Ballet for the Royal Swedish Ballet), EP, 2012
Phantasmata Domestica (with Black Sun Productions), Old Europa Cafe, 2012
A Swan Lake (Alexander Ekman's A Swan Lake premiered at the Oslo Opera House), 2014
Midummer Night’s Dream (two songs from Alexander Ekman's full evening ballet, performed by Anna von Hausswolff), 2015
Cow (the music to Alexander Ekman's ballet for the Semperoper Ballett in Dresden, Germany), 2016
The Echo Drift (a chamber opera, performed live at the Prototype Festival), 2018
Paper Plane (the score to Mari Carrasco's dance piece for Riksteatern, Sweden), 2018
Internally Black (written for Mari Carrasco's piece Svart Invärtes for Norrdans), Rough State Sound, 2018
Black Forrest (the score to Mari Carrasco's dance piece “Black Forest” for Norrdans)
The Eskapist (Alexander Ekman's Contemporary Ballet performance, Royal Swedish Ballet, 2019)

References

External links
Official website

1975 births
Living people
Swedish composers
Swedish male composers